Gitavan ("settlement of knowledge" or "settlement of science") is a name for campus of research institutions in Armenia with habitable area for scientists. Examples are gitavan of Institute for Physical Research and the Institute of Radiophysics and Electronics, both forming a part of the National Academy of Sciences of Armenia.  In contrast to usual campus gitavan does not have any institutional or educational meaning, it rather refers to settlement for scientific institution and scientists together.

It is located a couple of kilometers outside the town of Ashtarak in Aragatsotn province of Armenia and is 20 kilometers far from the capital Yerevan. Gitavan was founded at the beginning of 1960s and is situated 1087 meters above sea level.

See also 
Aragatsotn Province

Populated places in Aragatsotn Province